Unionville is an unincorporated community and census-designated place in East Marlborough Township in southern Chester County, Pennsylvania, United States.  It was originally known as Jacksonville. The Unionville Village Historic District was added to the National Register of Historic Places in 1979. As of 2020, the CDP has a population of 577.

Education
Unionville is located in the Unionville-Chadds Ford School District.

Sports
Unionville High School is a member of the Ches-mont league since 2007, in PIAA District 1.

Notable residents
John H. Pugh (1827–1905), represented New Jersey's 2nd congressional district in the United States House of Representatives,  1877-1879
I. Milton Smith, poet in the latter half of the nineteenth century; born in Unionville

References

External links

Unionville-Chadds Ford School District website
East Marlborough Township website

Unincorporated communities in Chester County, Pennsylvania
Unincorporated communities in Pennsylvania